Horní Lhota is a municipality and village in Ostrava-City District in the Moravian-Silesian Region of the Czech Republic. It has about 900 inhabitants.

History
The first written mention of Horní Lhota is from 1441.

References

Villages in Ostrava-City District